DVOA can refer to:

Dead Voices on Air
Defense-adjusted Value Over Average;  see Football Outsiders
Delaware Valley Orienteering Association